Lisa Carol Camilleri, (born 24 February 1983 in Tully, North Queensland) is a professional squash player who represented Australia. She reached a career-high world ranking of World No. 28 in May 2011.

References

External links 
 
 
 
 

Australian female squash players
Living people
1983 births
Squash players at the 2010 Commonwealth Games
Commonwealth Games competitors for Australia
21st-century Australian women